The following highways are numbered 889:

United States